Dancing with the Dead is the fourth studio album by the Swedish industrial metal project Pain. It was released in March 2005 via Stockholm Records and managed to reach No. 3 on the Swedish album charts, higher than any Pain album to date. It features the single "Same Old Song", which reached No. 18 on the Swedish charts.

The album was inspired by Peter Tägtgren's mysterious collapse in a pub, during which his heart stopped beating for two minutes.

Track listing

Videos
Music videos were produced for the songs "Same Old Song", "Nothing" and "Bye/Die".

Personnel
Pain
Peter Tägtgren – vocals, guitar, bass & drums

Production
Peter Tägtgren – producer, mixing, recording
Björn Engelmann – mastering
Micke Eriksson – design
Mikeadelica – photography

References

2005 albums
Pain (musical project) albums
Albums produced by Peter Tägtgren